András Rajna (born September 3, 1960) is a Hungarian sprint canoer who competed from the early 1980s to the late 1990s. Competing in three Summer Olympics, he won a silver medal in the K-4 1000 m event at Atlanta  in 1996.

Rajna also won three medals at the ICF Canoe Sprint World Championships with two silvers (K-2 500 m: 1986, 1994) and a bronze (K-4 500 m: 1983).

References

Sports-reference.com profile

1960 births
Canoeists at the 1988 Summer Olympics
Canoeists at the 1992 Summer Olympics
Canoeists at the 1996 Summer Olympics
Hungarian male canoeists
Living people
Olympic canoeists of Hungary
Olympic silver medalists for Hungary
Olympic medalists in canoeing
ICF Canoe Sprint World Championships medalists in kayak
Medalists at the 1996 Summer Olympics
20th-century Hungarian people